{{Infobox election
| election_name = 2004 United States Senate election in Colorado
| country = Colorado
| type = presidential
| ongoing = no
| previous_election = 1998 United States Senate election in Colorado
| previous_year = 1998
| next_election = 2010 United States Senate election in Colorado
| next_year = 2010
| election_date = November 2, 2004
| image1 = 
| nominee1 = Ken Salazar
| party1 = Democratic Party (United States)
| popular_vote1 = 1,081,188
| percentage1 = 51.3%
| image2 = 
| nominee2 = Pete Coors
| party2 = Republican Party (United States)
| popular_vote2 = 980,668
| percentage2 = 46.5%
| map_image = 2004 United States Senate election in Colorado results map by county.svg
| map_size = 250px
| map_caption = County resultsSalazar:    Coors:   
| title = U.S. Senator
| before_election = Ben Nighthorse Campbell
| before_party = Republican Party (United States)
| after_election = Ken Salazar
| after_party = Democratic Party (United States)
}}

The 2004 United States Senate election in Colorado' took place on November 2, 2004 alongside other elections to the United States Senate in other states as well as elections to the United States House of Representatives and various state and local elections. Incumbent Republican U.S. Senator Ben Nighthorse Campbell decided to retire instead of seeking a third term. Democratic nominee Ken Salazar won the open seat, defeating Republican nominee Pete Coors.

 Background 
On March 3, 2004, incumbent Republican Senator Ben Nighthorse Campbell announced that he would not seek reelection due to health concerns, having recently been treated for prostate cancer and heartburn. Before Campbell's retirement, no prominent Democrat had entered the race, with educator Mike Miles and businessman Rutt Bridges pursuing the Democratic nomination. After Campbell's retirement, many expected popular Republican Governor Bill Owens to enter the race, however he declined to run. Campbell's retirement and Owens' decision not to run prompted a number of prominent Democrats to reexamine the race.

 Democratic primary 
 Candidates 
 Ken Salazar, Attorney General of Colorado
 Mike Miles, educator

 Campaign 
On March 10, the same day Owens announced he would not run, U.S. Congressman Mark Udall entered the race. The next day, state Attorney General Ken Salazar entered the race, leading Udall to immediately withdraw and endorse him, Udall eventually elected in 2008. Salazar lost to Mike Miles at the State nominating convention. In spite of this loss, the national Democratic Party backed Salazar with contributions from the DSCC and promotion of Salazar as the only primary candidate.

 Results 

 Republican primary 
 Candidates 
 Pete Coors, former CEO and Chairman of Coors Brewing Company
 Bob Schaffer, U.S. Representative

 Campaign 
The two candidates got into an ideological battle, as Schaffer attacked Coors because his company had provided benefits to the partners of its gay and lesbian employees, in addition to promoting its beer in gay bars. Coors defended himself by saying that he was opposed to same-sex marriage, and supported a constitutional amendment to ban it, although he noted that he supported civil unions for gay couples. According to the Rocky Mountain News'', Coors described his company's pro-LGBT practices as "good business, separate from politics."

Results 
Coors defeated Schaffer with 61% of the vote in the primary, with many analysts citing his high name recognition in the state as a primary factor.

General election

Candidates

Major 
 Pete Coors (R), former CEO and Chairman of Coors Brewing Company
 Ken Salazar (D), State Attorney General

Minor 
 Douglas Campbell (C)
 Victor Good (Re)
 Finn Gotaas (I)
 John Harris (I)
 Richard Randall (L)

Campaign 
Pete Coors, Chairman of Coors Brewing Company, ran as a moderate conservative. However, Salazar was also a moderate and a highly popular State Attorney General. Coors is also a great-grandson of Adolph Coors, founder of the brewing company. His father is Joseph Coors, President of the company and founding member of the conservative think tank, the Heritage Foundation. Salazar narrowly won the open seat. It was one of only two Democratic pickups in the 2004 Senate elections (Illinois was the other).

Debates
Complete video of debate, October 29, 2004

Finances 
According to OpenSecrets, Coors gave his own campaign $1,213,657 and received individual donations of $60,550 from other Coors family members.

A state record total of over $11 million was raised during the election.

Predictions

Polling

Results

See also 
 2004 United States Senate elections

References 

2004 Colorado elections
Colorado
2004